AO Koropi or Koropi FC is a football club based in Koropi, Greece.  It was founded in 1903.  Its logo and jerseys are blue white with its stripes in its shield-like logo.  The team plays in the Antonis Priftis Stadium.  The team has never won a title.

History

From 1930, it brought its first game until 1940 when it won the championships in the area of Mesogeia.

From 1961, it played in the Athens premier division and for a few years made it to the Athens and the National first division.  From 1969 until 1977, the team remained in the first division and were one of the greatest spaces in the junction of the team.  After its large period in the local championships, Koropi FC won and returned itself into the national third division in 2006 and currently plays since.  From 2004, it plays in the East Attica Football Clubs Association after its separation.

Achievements
Athens FCA Second Division (1):
1966
East Attica FCA (1):
2004
Delta Ethniki Group 7 (1):
2006
East Attica Cup (1):
2011

Season to season

Sources:

League and cup history

References

External links
Official Website
Koropi Antinos Priftis Stadium

 
Association football clubs established in 1903
Football clubs in Attica
1903 establishments in Greece